Heslley Jader Couto Ferreira (born 6 July 1983) is a former Brazilian footballer.

References

1983 births
Living people
Sportspeople from Goiás
Brazilian footballers
Association football defenders
Sport Club Barueri players
Campeonato Brasileiro Série B players
Associação Portuguesa de Desportos players
Associação Atlética Internacional (Limeira) players
Estrela do Norte Futebol Clube players
Liga Portugal 2 players
S.C. Freamunde players
Portimonense S.C. players
Segunda Divisão players
G.D. Chaves players
C.D. Águila footballers
Brazilian expatriate footballers
Expatriate footballers in Portugal
Brazilian expatriate sportspeople in Portugal
Expatriate footballers in El Salvador
Brazilian expatriate sportspeople in El Salvador